The 2014 Canadian Rugby Championship was the 6th season of the Canadian Rugby Championship. The competition took place between August 9 and September 27, 2014. The format for the 2014 season changed with the tournament seeing each team play a home-and-away series against each of their three opponents for a total of six games.

Teams

Standings

Fixtures
 All times local to where the game is being played

Week 1

Week 2

Week 3

Week 4

Week 5

Week 6

Week 7

See also 
Canadian Rugby Championship
Rugby Canada

References 

Canadian Rugby Championship
Canadian Rugby Championship seasons
CRC